The 2018–19 Duquesne Dukes women's basketball team will represent Duquesne University during the 2018–19 NCAA Division I women's basketball season. The Dukes were led by sixth year head coach Dan Burt. The Dukes were members of the Atlantic 10 Conference and play their home games at the Palumbo Center. They finished the season 19–13, 11–5 in A-10 play to finish in third place. They advance to the semifinals of the A-10 women's tournament where they lost to Fordham. Despite having 19 wins, they were not invited to a postseason tournament for the first time since 2008.

2018–19 media

Duquesne Dukes Sports Network
Alex Panormios and Tad Maurey provide the call for home games on A-10 Digital Network. Select games will be televised.

Roster

Schedule

|-
!colspan=9 style=| Non-conference regular season

|-
!colspan=9 style=| Atlantic 10 regular season

|-
!colspan=9 style=| Atlantic 10 Tournament

Rankings

See also
 2018–19 Duquesne Dukes men's basketball team

References

Duquesne
Duquesne Dukes women's basketball seasons
Duquesne
Duquesne